Mount Louis is a  mountain summit located in southeast Banff National Park in Alberta, Canada. It is part of the Sawback Range which is a subset of the Canadian Rockies.

The mountain was named in 1886 after Louis B. Stewart who surveyed in the Banff Park area in 1904 with his father, George Stewart, the first Park Superintendent.


Geology

Mount Louis is composed of limestone, a sedimentary rock laid down during the Devonian period. Formed in shallow seas, this sedimentary rock was pushed east and over the top of younger rock during the Laramide orogeny.

Climate

Based on the Köppen climate classification, Mount Louis is located in a subarctic climate zone with cold, snowy winters, and mild summers. Temperatures can drop below -20 °C with wind chill factors below -30 °C. Weather conditions during summer months are optimum for climbing. Precipitation runoff from Mount Louis drains into the Bow River which is a tributary of the Saskatchewan River.

See also
List of mountains of Canada
Geology of Alberta

References

External links
 National Park Service web site: Banff National Park

Gallery

 

Two-thousanders of Alberta
Mountains of Banff National Park